Rolamellah Nouar (born 27 June 1982 in Miramas) is a French-born Algerian football player who currently plays for French club US Le Pontet. He previously had stints with professional clubs Stade Lavallois and Amiens SC and has spent his entire career playing in the French amateur divisions. Despite being born in France, Nouar has represented Algeria at international level.

References

External links
 
 

1982 births
Living people
French footballers
Algerian footballers
French sportspeople of Algerian descent
Stade Lavallois players
Amiens SC players
RCO Agde players
FC Sète 34 players
US Orléans players
Gap HAFC players
Stade Beaucairois players
Montluçon Football players
Association football forwards